Dimitri Alekseyevich Isayev (also tr. Dmitriy Isaev, ; born 23 January 1973) is a Russian actor. He had prominent roles in film and television.

Early life
Isayev was born in Leningrad, Russian SFSR, Soviet Union, into a family with strong connections to the performing arts through his parents' involvement with the Tovstonogov Bolshoi Drama Theater (the son of a famous Soviet actor Vladislav Strzhelchik). He studied violin and piano.

Isayev held various jobs prior to entering the Saint Petersburg State Theatre Arts Academy from which he subsequently graduated in 1996. He served in the theater "Russian Enterprise" named after Andrei Mironov, "Comedian's Shelter" in the Komissarjevsky Theatre. In parallel, he worked fitness trainer, a masseur a store manager and was involved in dance, writing and song arranging. He appeared on television and radio programs. He was the second director in dubbing and film scoring.

Personal life
He married three times and twice divorced. His first marriage yielded two children, Sophia and Pauline. Isayev's first wife was Asya Shibarova, a classmate at the institute, and now an actress. The marriage ended amicably.

His second wife was prima ballerina Inna Ginkevich. He then married Oksana Рожок, a former ballet dancer, and resides in Serpukhov. In 2014, the couple had a son Alex.

Filmography
Isayev's works include:
1994 Debussy, or Mademoiselle Shu-Shu as Mozart
2001 Silver Wedding (TV)
2002 Госпожа победа (сериал) в роли Славы
2002 Sea node (TV series) as Eugene, scientist oceanographer
2003 Bandit Petersburg. Movie 6. Journalist (mini-series) as Vladik
2003 The Emperor's Love (TV series) as  tsarevich
2003 Mongoose (TV series) as football
2003 Streets of Broken Lights (TV Series 1 "Disinfection") as  operative   Pakhomov
2003-2004 Poor Nastya (TV series) as Czarevitch Alexander (Czar Alexander II)
2004-2005 Sins of the Fathers (TV series) as Peter Volkov
2004 Dear Masha Berezina (TV series) as violinist Eugene Abramov
2004 Online game as bogatyr
2005 Happy birthday, Queen! (TV) as Major George Andestend
2006 The Return of the Prodigal Pope (TV) as Aleksey
2006 Of flame and light (mini-series) as Prince Alexander Vasilchikov
2007 War and Peace (mini-series) as Nikolai Rostov
2007 Quartet for Two (TV) as Vadim
2007 Full breath as Kostya
2007 Can you hear me? as stepfather Lehi
2008 Our sins (TV) as Sergei
2008 Sand rain (TV) as Igor Zorin
2008 Vicissitudes of life (TV) as Anton Bestuzhev, husband of Dasha
2008 Blue Beard (TV) as Phillip
2009 Obsessed (TV series) as attorney Herman Dubrovnik
2010 Zagradotryad: Solo in a minefield (mini-series) as Cornflower
2010 There are six cartridges in the pistol (short film) as A hero
2010 Captain Gordeev.  Brothers Blood  (TV series, 1 season) as Kirill Shustov
2010 Hear My Heart (TV) as Kirill
2011 Vow of Silence (TV) as Goshi
2011 Prediction (TV) as Igor
2011 Бесприданница в роли Сергея Паратова
2011 Terminal (TV series) as Maks Orlov, head of brokerage
2011 Pushken (Ukraine, not completed ) as Olenin 
2011 Goddesses (Ukraine) as the heroine 's husband
2011 Gossamer Indian summer (TV) as Sergei
2011 Clues (TV series) as Sukhanov
2011 House on the edge as Sergei
2011 Sect (TV Mini-Series) as Daniil 
2012 Wild 3 (TV series) as Konstantin Sergeevich
2012 2A (short film) as Artyom
2012 Every  for himself (TV series) as Igor
2012 Give Me Sunday (TV series) as Mikhail Antonov
2012 1812: Ulan Ballad as Alexander I
2012 The last victim (TV) as Aleksey
2013 Not a woman's business (TV series) as Aleksey Gavrilov, lawyer
2013 Swear to protect (TV series) as Eugene Krechetov
2013 Flowers of Evil (mini-series) as Anatoly, a radio journalist
2013-2014 Bones (Russian version) (mini-series) as Denis, an Internet acquaintance of Kostina
2014 The road home (TV series) as Denis Romanov
2015 Golden Cage (TV series)
2015 Fulcrum points (TV series) as Kirill, Alexandra's husband
2015 Unthinkable life (TV series) as Dmitry Murashov, an official from the Department of Trade
2015 Village roman (TV series) as Vadim Shevelkov
2015 Not a couple (TV series) as Nechaev
2016 Provocateur (TV series) as Head of the department, Colonel Viktor Alekseevich Kamov
2017 Young Lady and Hooligan (TV series) as Michael Shalnov
2018 Чужая (TV series) as Sergey Polyakov
2018 Незнакомка в зеркале (TV series) as Danilov, plastic surgeon
2018 Shadow (TV series) as Constantin
2019 Legend  Ferrari (TV series) as Adjutant Wrangel, staff captain Vladimir Spesivtsev
2019 Detective in a million  (TV series) as millionaire Oleg Filatov
2020 Detective in a million-2 Victims of art  (TV series) as millionaire Oleg Filatov
2020 Detective in a million-3  Werewolf  (TV series) as millionaire Oleg Filatov
2021 Detective in a million-4  Payback  (TV series) as millionaire Oleg Filatov
2021 Зацепка (TV сериал) в роли безнесмена Владимира Резника
2021 According to the laws of wartime-5  Mutiny (TV series) as Captain of the Main Directorate of Information of the Polish Army Wlodek Wisniewski
2021 The Mystery of the Sleeping Lady  (TV series) as businessman Mikhail Gorlov
2021 A twist on happiness  (TV series) as Dmitry Kovalev
2022 Odessa (in production)  (TV series) 
2022 Репейник  
2022 Blind method

References

External links
 
Dmitriy Isaev on Kinopoisk

1973 births
Living people
Russian male film actors
Russian male television actors
Russian male stage actors
Russian State Institute of Performing Arts alumni
Male actors from Saint Petersburg